Aika Azman (born 2 March 1997) is a Malaysian female squash player. She made her international debut at the 2017 PSA World Tour and achieved her career best ranking of 80 during the tournament.

References 

1997 births
Living people
Malaysian female squash players
People from Kedah
21st-century Malaysian women